John Baxter (1889–1951) was an English footballer who played for Stoke.

Career
Baxter was born in Wigan and played amateur football in Staffordshire with Burslem, Liverpool Road, Congleton White Star and Tunstall Park before joining Derby County. After an unsuccessful spell in Derby, Baxter joined Stoke and played six times for the "Potters" during the 1910–11 season. He later played for Macclesfield Town.

Career statistics

References

1889 births
1951 deaths
Footballers from Wigan
Association football goalkeepers
English footballers
Derby County F.C. players
Stoke City F.C. players
Macclesfield Town F.C. players